Argile was a French poetry and art magazine published between 1973 and 1981. Argile  may also refer to:

Argile Smith (born 1955), clergyman and interim university president
Castello d'Argile, a commune in Bologna, Italy

See also
Argyle (disambiguation)
Argyll (disambiguation)
Argle (disambiguation)